Kendrapara District is an administrative district of Odisha state in eastern India. The town of Kendrapara is the district headquarters. Kendrapara District is situated in the eastern portion of the state, and is bounded on the north by Bhadrak district, on the east by the Bay of Bengal, on the south by Jagatsinghpur District, on the west by Cuttack District on the northwest by Jajpur District.

Geography
Kendrapara District lies in 20° 20’ N To 20° 37’ N Latitude and 86° 14’ E To 87° 01’ E Longitude and situated in central coastal plain zone of the Odisha.  The Bay of Bengal lies in the eastern part of the district. The coastline covers 48 km stretching from Dhamra Muhan to Batighar. Kendrapara district headquarters is 55 km from Cuttack.

Kendrapara District lies in the river delta formed by the Brahmani and Baitarani and branch rivers of Mahanadi. The Bhitarkanika Mangroves, Bhitarkanika National Park, Gahirmatha Beach and Baladevjew Temple lie in the district. Other features in the district include Suka-Parikshita Ashram, Kudanagari, Landibata Mahapurusha Matha Chanpur, Pentha sea beach, PatharaKani Temple Gogua, Harihar Kshetra Mahala, Gadadhara Gosain Pitha, and Korua. This district has 9 blocks named as Aul, Derabish, Garadpur, Mahakalapada, Marshaghai, Kendrapara, Rajanagar, Rajkanika, Patamundai.

Divisions
There are 9 Tahasils and 9 blocks in Kendrapara district. They are :

Tahasils
 Aul
 Kanika
 Kendrapara
 Marshaghai
 Pattamundai
 Rajnagar
 Mahakalpada
 Derabish
 Garadpur

Blocks
 Aul
 Derabish
 Garadpur
 Kendrapara
 Mahakalpada
 Marshaghai
 Pattamundai
 Rajakanika
 Rajnagar

Demographics

According to the 2011 census Kendrapara district has a population of 1,440,361, roughly equal to the nation of Eswatini or the US state of Hawaii. This gives it a ranking of 344th in India (out of a total of 640).
Its population growth rate over the decade 2001–2011 was 10.59%. Kendrapara has a sex ratio of 1006 females for every 1000 males, and a literacy rate of 85.93%. Scheduled Castes and Scheduled Tribes make up 21.51% and 0.66% of the population respectively.

At the time of the 2011 Census of India, 91.47% of the population in the district spoke Odia, 4.76% Bengali and 3.31% Urdu as their first language.

Politics

Vidhan sabha constituencies

The following is the 5 Vidhan sabha constituencies of Kendrapara district and the elected members of that area

References

External links

 

 
Districts of Odisha